Acalolepta olivacea is a species of beetle in the family Cerambycidae. It was described by Stephan von Breuning in 1944. It is known from Japan.

References

Acalolepta
Beetles described in 1944